Ivana Selakov (born 8 November 1978) is a Serbian singer. She was a member of the girlband Beauty Queens, which was formed by gathering backing vocalists of Marija Šerifović after victory in the Eurovision Song Contest 2007. During her career, she received numerous awards in Serbia – best singer, best song, best album, best duet and others.

Biography
Selakov was born in Belgrade, on 8 November 1978. She grew up in Sombor where she was introduced to the world of music. She finished Lower Music School, participated in numerous singing competitions, performed at jazz and rock 'n' roll clubs. In 1997, she started studying biology in Belgrade, but very soon she devoted herself to music. After biology, Ivana started studying "Recording and designing of the sound".

She has appeared as a soloist at several festivals—Radio Festival, Beovizija 2006, etc. She did vocal back-up for many popular artists, she has more than 2000 back vocals did for other singer and bands. Since 2007, she has been publishing her records under Serbian label and production company Grand Production.

In 2016 she was acting judge in children's singing show "Neki novi klinci".

Beauty Queens
See Beauty Queens.

Discography

Albums

Sreća (2010) 
 Uradi mi to
 Ako je do mene (duet sa Darkom Radovanovićem)
 Srce gubitnik
 Otplovimo
 Uteha
 Briga me
 Sad odlazi
 Moje je ime sreća
 Nek na tvoju dušu ide sve

Probijam led (2012) 
 Tuga k`o i svaka druga
 Daleko si (feat. Aca Lukas)
 Probijam led (feat. DJ Shone)
 Pobediću bol
 Jastuci
 Naše malo slavlje
 Igraj dok postojiš (feat. DJ Shone/Sha)
 Mesec dana
 Između redova
 Heroj
 Probijam led (RMX by DJ Shone)

S.O.S (2016) 
 Samačka
 Agonija
 Polovna
 Omaklo mi se (duet sa Acom Lukasom)
 Grad grad
 Tek sad
 Bolujem godinama
 SOS
 Ljubav u doba kokaina (duet sa Acom Lukasom)
 Godine i laži
 Nema plana (feat. Sha)

Singles 
 Pet na jedan (2007) Beauty Queens
 Protiv srca (2007) Beauty Queens
 Zavet (2008) Beauty Queens
 Moje odbrane

External links
 Beauty Queens Official Site
 Ivana Selakov Interview
 Official website
 

1978 births
Living people
Musicians from Sombor
Singers from Belgrade
21st-century Serbian women singers
Grand Production artists
Beovizija contestants